The 1927 Northern Illinois State Teachers football team represented Northern Illinois State Teachers College—now known as Northern Illinois University—as an independent during the 1927 college football season. Led by second-year head coach Roland Cowell, the Teachers compiled a record of 1–4–1 record. Northern Illinois State played home games at Glidden Field, located on the east end of campus in DeKalb, Illinois. Howard Larson and Ivan Nicholas were the team's co-captains.

Schedule

References

Northern Illinois State
Northern Illinois Huskies football seasons
Northern Illinois State Teachers football